Wellington is a city and county seat of Collingsworth County, Texas, United States. The population was 2,189 at the 2010 census.

History
Sometime in 1889 or 1890, as smaller ranches and farmlands were being purchased, Ernest Theodore O'Neil, his brother-in-law John Simon McConnell, and John W. Swearingen, together had purchased the land upon which the town currently sits, for $5.00 per acre. Subsequently, O'Neil, who originally owned a fourth of the section of the township, purchased the interests of McConnell and Swearingen, and retained sole ownership of the land. In August 1890, a petition was circulated to organize the county, choose a county seat, and elect county officers. Two potential townships were proposed: Wellington and Pearl. The proposed town of Wellington was located on the land owned by Ernest T. O'Neil who was promoting this location, and had been given its proposed name by his wife, Matilda Anna Elisabeth "Lizzie" O'Neil, who greatly admired the Duke of Wellington, hero of the Battle of Waterloo. The alternate and proposed town of Pearl was located several miles north of Wellington.

In September 1890, the vote was held and Wellington was selected for the seat of the newly organized county of Collingsworth. In 1891 the new city, laid out by Ernest T. O'Neil, was surveyed and platted, and the first postal service and postmaster, Carrie M. Barton, was established on January 9, 1891. Construction of a courthouse began in 1893, and the contractor, J. A. White, built the courthouse of locally made bricks. With the extra materials left over from the courthouse, J. A. White erected a mercantile store for Ernest T. O'Neil. This became the first mercantile store and commercial building in Wellington, prior to the opening of a two-story hotel by O'Neil. Later O'Neil organized the first bank, was active in all phases of the county's growth and development, and served as postmaster from August 22, 1895 to December 11, 1897.

Early in the early 20th century, Wellington was connected through Altus, Oklahoma with Wichita Falls, Texas through the Wichita Falls and Wellington Railway, one of the properties of the industrialist Joseph A. Kemp of Wichita Falls. In 1914, this route was leased by the since-defunct Missouri–Kansas–Texas Railroad.  The Wellington-to-Altus segment was abandoned in 1958.

The first time Bonnie and Clyde (Bonnie Park and Clyde Barrow) made The New York Times newspaper was their incident at the Prichard farm. Bonnie is referenced as a "woman companion", and the perpetrators are Clyde Barrow and his brother whose name is given as Icy. With the location as "Wellington, Texas", the story tells of their wrecking their car, terrorizing a family and shooting the daughter-in-law (but actually their daughter), kidnapping two law enforcement officers and taking them in their car near Erick, Oklahoma, where the two kidnapped men were tied to a tree with barbed wire cut from a fence. They freed themselves and alerted local law enforcement, but the trail had gone cold.

Geography

Wellington is located in southern Collingsworth County at  (34.854616, –100.213626). U.S. Route 83 runs along the eastern edge of the city, leading north  to Shamrock and Interstate 40, and south  to Childress. Texas State Highway 203 leads east  to the Oklahoma border and west  to Quail.

Climate
According to the Köppen Climate Classification system, Wellington has a semi-arid climate, abbreviated "BSk" on climate maps.

Demographics

2020 census

As of the 2020 United States census, there were 1,896 people, 828 households, and 563 families residing in the city.

2000 census
As of the census of 2000, there were 2,275 people, 906 households, and 615 families residing in the city. The population density was 1,670.4 people per square mile (645.9/km2). There were 1,162 housing units at an average density of 853.2/sq mi (329.9/km2). The racial makeup of the city was 75.87% White, 6.95% African American, 1.05% Native American, 0.22% Asian, 13.23% from other races, and 2.68% from two or more races. Hispanic or Latino of any race were 25.10% of the population.

There were 906 households, out of which 31.5% had children under the age of 18 living with them, 52.5% were married couples living together, 11.4% had a female householder with no husband present, and 32.1% were non-families. 30.7% of all households were made up of individuals, and 20.0% had someone living alone who was 65 years of age or older. The average household size was 2.45 and the average family size was 3.08.

In the city, the population was spread out, with 28.4% under the age of 18, 6.9% from 18 to 24, 23.5% from 25 to 44, 19.5% from 45 to 64, and 21.8% who were 65 years of age or older. The median age was 38 years. For every 100 females, there were 89.6 males. For every 100 females age 18 and over, there were 82.5 males.

The median income for a household in the city was $23,260, and the median income for a family was $30,257. Males had a median income of $25,143 versus $15,368 for females. The per capita income for the city was $13,997. About 17.4% of families and 22.5% of the population were below the poverty line, including 32.2% of those under age 18 and 20.1% of those age 65 or over.

Education
Public education in the city of Wellington is provided by the Wellington Independent School District and is home to the Wellington Skyrockets

Notable people 

 John Aaron, NASA engineer (born here and reared in Oklahoma) who played an important roles in both the Apollo 12 and Apollo 13 moon missions
 Sophie Brown, girl with lupus; 2018 UIL Individual State Spelling Champion; first Wellington High School Student to attend Harvard University
 Loyd Colson, former Major League Baseball pitcher
 Jan Fortune (born 1892), journalist and writer; first girl born in town
 Glen D. Hardin, piano player and arranger with the TCB Band
 Omar Hernandez, Nebraska Wesleyan University (NWU) Assistant Director Of Athletic And Recreation Facilities, Buffalo Bills Intern
 Bob O'Rear, seventh Microsoft-employee and multi-millionaire
 Jimmy Webb, Grammy Award-winning songwriter; lived in Wellington in the 1950s when his father pastored the Faith Baptist Church
 Tex Winter, former college and NBA head coach who created the triangle offense in basketball

See also
Greenbelt Electric Cooperative

Gallery

References

External links

 Wellington community information
 Collingsworth Public Library

Cities in Collingsworth County, Texas
Cities in Texas
County seats in Texas